Saenura is a genus of moth in the subfamily Arctiinae. It contains only one species, Saenura flava, which can be found in southern Africa.

The larvae feed on Tagetes erecta, Senecio species, Cassia occidentalis, Cassia tomentosa, Tephrosia species, Acacia mearnsii, Ornithogalium eckloni, Protea multibracteata, Rubus pinnotus, Smilax species and Lantana species.

References

Natural History Museum Lepidoptera generic names catalog

Spilosomina
Insects of Namibia
Insects of Angola
Moths of Africa
Monotypic moth genera